Leda Cosmides (born May 1957) is an American psychologist, who, together with anthropologist husband John Tooby, helped develop the field of evolutionary psychology.

Biography
Cosmides originally studied biology at Radcliffe College/Harvard University, receiving her BA in 1979. While an undergraduate, she was influenced by the renowned evolutionary biologist Robert L. Trivers, who was her advisor. In 1985, Cosmides received a PhD in cognitive psychology from Harvard. After completing postdoctoral work under Roger Shepard at Stanford University, she joined the faculty of the University of California, Santa Barbara in 1991, becoming a full professor in 2000.

In 1992, together with Tooby and Jerome Barkow, Cosmides edited The Adapted Mind: Evolutionary Psychology and the Generation of Culture. She and Tooby also co-founded and co-direct the Center for Evolutionary Psychology.

Cosmides was awarded the 1988 American Association for the Advancement of Science Prize for Behavioral Science Research, the 1993 American Psychological Association Distinguished Scientific Award for an Early Career Contribution to Psychology, a Guggenheim Fellowship, the 2005 National Institutes of Health Director's Pioneer Award, and the 2020 Jean Nicod Prize.

Selected publications
Books
Barkow, J., Cosmides, L. & Tooby, J., (eds) (1992) The Adapted Mind: Evolutionary psychology and the generation of culture (New York: Oxford University Press).
Tooby, J. & Cosmides, L. (2000) Evolutionary psychology: Foundational papers (Cambridge, MA: MIT Press).
Cosmides, L. & Tooby, J. (in press) Universal Minds: Explaining the new science of evolutionary psychology (Darwinism Today Series) (London: Weidenfeld & Nicolson).

Papers
Cosmides, L. & Tooby, J. (1981) Cytoplasmic inheritance and intragenomic conflict. Journal of Theoretical Biology, 89, 83-129.
Cosmides, L. & Tooby, J. (1987) "From evolution to behavior: Evolutionary psychology as the missing link" in J. Dupre (ed.), The latest on the best: Essays on evolution and optimality (Cambridge, MA: The MIT Press).
Cosmides, L. (1989) "The logic of social exchange: Has natural selection shaped how humans reason? Studies with the Wason selection task," Cognition, 31, 187–276.
Cosmides, L. & Tooby, J. (1992) "Cognitive adaptations for social exchange," in Barkow, J., Cosmides, L. & Tooby, J., (eds) (1992) The adapted mind: Evolutionary psychology and the generation of culture (New York: Oxford University Press).
Cosmides, L. & Tooby, J. (2003) "Evolutionary psychology: Theoretical Foundations," in Encyclopedia of Cognitive Science (London: Macmillan).
Tooby, J. & Cosmides, L. (2005) "Evolutionary psychology: Conceptual foundations," in D. M. Buss (ed.), Handbook of Evolutionary Psychology (New York: Wiley).

See also
 Behavioural genetics
 Human behavioral ecology
 Standard social science model
 The Adapted Mind

References

External links

Leda Cosmides's Website
Detailed CV
Publication list with full text access
Center for Evolutionary Psychology
Evolutionary Psychology: A Primer, by Leda Cosmides & John Tooby
 The Adapted Mind: Evolutionary Psychology and the Generation of Culture, Barkow, Jerome H., Leda Cosmides, and John Tooby (eds), New York, NY: Oxford University Press, 1992

American women psychologists
American cognitive scientists
Evolutionary psychologists
Human Behavior and Evolution Society
Stanford University alumni
University of California, Santa Barbara faculty
Scientists from Philadelphia
Radcliffe College alumni
1957 births
Living people
Center for Advanced Study in the Behavioral Sciences fellows
Jean Nicod Prize laureates
21st-century American women scientists